Alejandro Carlos Milano (born 10 April 1975) is an Argentine football manager and former player who played as a midfielder. He is the current manager of Barracas Central along with Rodolfo de Paoli.

Playing career
Born in Buenos Aires, Milano began his career with Almagro, being promoted to the first team in 1995. In 2002, he moved to Barracas Central.

In 2006, Milano left Barracas and joined Sacachispas. He retired in the following year, aged 32.

Managerial career
In 2008, Milano was an interim manager of Barracas Central in the Primera C Metropolitana. In April 2017, he was again named interim after  left, being in charge until November when Alejandro Nanía took over.

On 3 March 2020, Milano was appointed manager of Barracas Central, after  resigned. He left the role the following 26 January, being named sporting director of the first team while Rodolfo de Paoli was named manager.

On 15 August 2022, Milano returned to managerial duties, after being named in charge of Barracas along with de Paoli.

References

External links

1975 births
Living people
Footballers from Buenos Aires
Argentine footballers
Association football midfielders
Argentine Primera División players
Primera Nacional players
Club Almagro players
Barracas Central players
Sacachispas Fútbol Club players
Argentine football managers
Primera B Nacional managers
Barracas Central managers